Inchgalbraith is an islet in Loch Lomond, Scotland, and is the ancestral home of Clan Galbraith.

History 
Inchgalbraith, is as its name implies, connected with Clan Galbraith, and was one of their strongholds. The remains of their ancient castle can still be seen on it. It is possibly a crannog. Probably, in the late 19th century the castle restored by gravelly concrete.

Geography 
The most area on the island is covered by the castle and now with the collapsed stones from the castle itself.

Wildlife
Inchgalbraith was a breeding place for ospreys until 1869.

References

External links
 https://web.archive.org/web/20080909125707/http://www.loch-lomond.net/islands/inchgalbraith.html
 https://web.archive.org/web/20090710015304/http://lochlomond-islands.com/
article which mentions it

Galbraith
Uninhabited islands of Argyll and Bute